The Wiota Gravels is a geologic formation in Montana. It preserves fossils dating to the Pleistocene .

See also

 List of fossiliferous stratigraphic units in Montana
 Paleontology in Montana

References
 
 

Geologic formations of Montana